Otto (1 June 181526 July 1867) was a Bavarian prince who ruled as King of Greece from the establishment of the monarchy on 27 May 1832, under the Convention of London, until he was deposed on 23 October 1862.

The second son of King Ludwig I of Bavaria, Otto ascended the newly created throne of Greece at age 17. His government was initially run by a three-man regency council made up of Bavarian court officials. Upon reaching his majority, Otto removed the regents when they proved unpopular with the people, and he ruled as an absolute monarch. Eventually his subjects' demands for a constitution proved overwhelming, and in the face of an armed (but bloodless) insurrection, Otto granted a constitution in 1843.

Throughout his reign Otto was unable to resolve Greece's poverty and prevent economic meddling from outside. Greek politics in this era were based on affiliations with the three Great Powers that had guaranteed Greece's independence, Britain, France and Russia, and Otto's ability to maintain the support of the powers was key to his remaining in power. To remain strong, Otto had to play the interests of each of the Great Powers' Greek adherents against the others, while not irritating the Great Powers. When Greece was blockaded by the British Royal Navy in 1850 and again in 1854, to stop Greece from attacking the Ottoman Empire during the Crimean War, Otto's standing amongst Greeks suffered. As a result, there was an assassination attempt on Queen Amalia, and finally in 1862 Otto was deposed while in the countryside. He died in exile in Bavaria in 1867.

Early life and ascension

Otto was born as Prince Otto Friedrich Ludwig of Bavaria at Schloss Mirabell in Salzburg (when it briefly belonged to the Kingdom of Bavaria), as the second son of Crown Prince Ludwig of Bavaria and Therese of Saxe-Hildburghausen. His father served there as the Bavarian governor-general. Through his ancestor, the Bavarian Duke John II, Otto was a descendant of the Byzantine imperial dynasties of Komnenos and Laskaris. His father was a prominent Philhellene, and provided significant financial aid to the Greek cause during the War of Independence.

At the end of Greek War of Independence, the three Great Powers formulated the London Protocol of 1829, which established an autonomous Greek state  under the rule of a "Hereditary Christian Prince." Numerous candidates were considered for the vacant Greek throne, including the French Duke of Nemours, Prince Frederick of the Netherlands and Otto's uncle, Prince Karl Theodor of Bavaria. Even an Irishman named Nicholas Macdonald Sarsfield Cod'd put himself forward, claiming descent from the Byzantine Palaiologos dynasty. Ultimately, they settled on Prince Leopold of Saxe-Coburg and Gotha, and in the amended London Protocol of 1830 made Greece into a fully independent Kingdom under his rule. Although initially enthusiastic, Leopold was discouraged by the gloomy picture of the country's stability painted by Ioannis Kapodistrias, Greece's governor, and so rejected the crown, concerns that would prove well-founded when Kapodistrias was assassinated a year later. In 1832 British Foreign Secretary Lord Palmerston convened the London conference, which offered the crown to the teenage Prince Otto, which he happily accepted. The Bavarian House of Wittelsbach had no connections to ruling dynasties of any of the Great Powers, and so was a neutral choice with which they were all satisfied. The Greeks were not consulted, but Greece was in chaos and no group or individual could claim to represent it anyway.

The Great Powers extracted a pledge from Otto's father to restrain him from hostile actions against the Ottoman Empire. They also insisted that his title be "King of Greece", rather than "King of the Hellenes", because the latter would imply a claim over the millions of Greeks then still under Turkish rule. Not quite 18, the young prince arrived in Greece with 3,500 Bavarian troops (the Bavarian Auxiliary Corps) and three Bavarian advisors aboard the British frigate HMS Madagascar. Although he did not speak Greek, he immediately endeared himself to his adopted country by adopting the Greek national costume and Hellenizing his name to "Othon" (some English sources, such as Encyclopædia Britannica, call him "Otho"). Thousands lined the docks of Nafplio to witness his arrival, including many heroes of the revolution such as Theodoros Kolokotronis and Alexandros Mavrokordatos. His arrival was initially enthusiastically welcomed by the Greek people as an end to the chaos of the prior years and the beginning of the rejuvenation of the Greek nation. A year later Greek poet Panagiotis Soutsos evoked the scene in Leander, the first novel to be published in independent Greece:

Early reign 
Otto's reign is usually divided into three periods:
 The years of Regency Council: 1832–1835
 The years of Absolute Monarchy: 1835–1843
 The years of Constitutional Monarchy: 1843–1862

The Bavarian advisors were arrayed in a Regency Council, headed by Count Josef Ludwig von Armansperg, who, in Bavaria as minister of finance, had recently succeeded in restoring Bavarian credit, at the cost of his popularity. Von Armansperg was the President of the Privy Council and the first representative (or Prime Minister) of the new Greek government. The other members of the Regency Council were Karl von Abel and Georg Ludwig von Maurer, with whom von Armansperg often clashed. After the king reached his majority in 1835, von Armansperg was made Arch-Secretary, but was called Arch-Chancellor by the Greek press.

Britain and the Rothschild bank, who were underwriting the Greek loans, insisted on financial stringency from Armansperg. The Greeks were soon more heavily taxed than under Ottoman rule; as the people saw it, they had exchanged a hated Ottoman rule for government by a foreign bureaucracy, the "Bavarocracy" (Βαυαροκρατία).

In addition, the regency showed little respect for local customs. As a Roman Catholic, Otto himself was viewed as a heretic by many pious Greeks; however, his heirs would have to be Orthodox, according to the terms of the 1843 Constitution.King Otto brought his personal brewmaster with him, Herr Fuchs, a Bavarian who stayed in Greece after Otto's departure and introduced Greece to beer, under the label "Fix".

Popular heroes and leaders of the Greek Revolution, such as generals Theodoros Kolokotronis and Yiannis Makriyiannis, who opposed the Bavarian-dominated regency, were charged with treason, put in jail and sentenced to death. They were later pardoned under popular pressure, while Greek judges who resisted Bavarian pressure and refused to sign the death warrants (Anastasios Polyzoidis and Georgios Tertsetis, for instance), were saluted as heroes.

Otto's early reign was also notable for his moving the capital of Greece from Nafplion to Athens. His first task as king was to make a detailed archaeological and topographic survey of Athens. He assigned Gustav Eduard Schaubert and Stamatios Kleanthis to complete this task. At that time, Athens had a population of roughly 4,000–5,000 people, located mainly in what today covers the district of Plaka in Athens.

Athens was chosen as the Greek capital for historical and sentimental reasons, not because it was a large city. At the time, it was a town consisting of only 400 houses at the foot of the Acropolis. A modern city plan was laid out, and public buildings erected. The finest legacy of this period are the buildings of the University of Athens (1837, under the name Othonian University), the Athens Polytechnic University (1837, under the name Royal School of Arts), the National Gardens of Athens (1840), the National Library of Greece (1842), the Old Royal Palace (now the Greek Parliament Building, 1843), and the Old Parliament Building (1858). Schools and hospitals were established all over the (still small) Greek dominion. Due to the negative feelings of the Greek people toward non-Greek rule, historical attention to this aspect of his reign has been neglected.

During 1836–37, Otto visited Germany, marrying a beautiful and talented 17-year-old, Duchess Amalia (Amelie) of Oldenburg (21 December 1818 to 20 May 1875). The wedding took place not in Greece but in Oldenburg, on 22 November 1836; the marriage did not produce an heir, and the new queen made herself unpopular by interfering in the government and maintaining her Lutheran faith. Otto was unfaithful to his wife, and had an affair with Jane Digby, a notorious woman his father had previously taken as a lover. 

Due to his having overtly undermined the king, Armansperg was dismissed from his duties by King Otto immediately upon his return from Germany. However, despite high hopes on the part of the Greeks, the Bavarian Rudhart was appointed chief minister, and the granting of a constitution was again postponed. The attempts of Otto to conciliate Greek sentiment through efforts to enlarge the frontiers of his kingdom, for example by the suggested acquisition of Crete in 1841, failed in their objective and only succeeded in embroiling him in conflict with the Great Powers.

Parties, finances and the church

Throughout his reign, King Otto found himself confronted by a recurring series of problems: partisanship of the Greeks, financial uncertainty, and ecclesiastical disputes.

Greek parties in the Othonian era were based on two factors: the political activities of the diplomatic representatives of the Great Powers Russia, United Kingdom and France and the affiliation of Greek political figures with these diplomats.

According to Richard Clogg, the financial uncertainty of the Othonian monarchy was the result of
 Greece's poverty;
 the concentration of land in the hands of a small number of wealthy "primates" like the Mavromichalis family of Mani; and,
 the promise of 60,000,000 francs in loans from the Great Powers, which kept these nations involved in Greek internal affairs and the Crown constantly seeking to please one or the other power to ensure the flow of funds.

The political machinations of the Great Powers were personified in their three legates in Athens: the French Theobald Piscatory, the Russian Gabriel Catacazy, and the English Edmund Lyons. They informed their home governments on the activities of the Greeks, while serving as advisers to their respective allied parties within Greece.

Otto pursued policies such as balancing power among all the parties and sharing offices among the parties, ostensibly to reduce the power of the parties while trying to bring a pro-Othon party into being. The parties, however, became the entree into government power and financial stability.

The effect of his (and his advisors') policies was to make the Great Powers' parties more powerful, not less. The Great Powers did not support curtailing Otto's increasing absolutism, however, which resulted in a near permanent conflict between Otto's absolute monarchy and the power bases of his Greek subjects.

Otto found himself confronted by a number of intractable ecclesiastical issues: 1) monasticism, 2) Autocephaly, 3) the king as head of the Church and 4) toleration of other churches.

His regents, Armansperg and Rundhart, established a controversial policy of suppressing the monasteries. This was very upsetting to the Church hierarchy. Russia considered itself a stalwart defender of Orthodoxy, but Orthodox believers were found in all three parties. Once he rid himself of his Bavarian advisers, Otto allowed the statutory dissolution of the monasteries to lapse.

By tradition dated back to the Byzantine era, the king was regarded by the Church as part of its head. On the issue of the Church's Autocephaly and his role as king within the Church, Otto was overwhelmed by the arcana of Orthodox Church doctrine and popular discontent with his Roman Catholicism (while the Queen was Protestant).

In 1833, the regents had unilaterally declared the Autocephaly of the Church of Greece. This was a recognition of the de facto political situation, as the Patriarch of Constantinople was partially under the political control of the Ottoman Empire. However, faithful people, concerned that having a Catholic as the head of the Church of Greece would weaken the Orthodox Church, criticised the unilateral declaration of Autocephaly as non-canonical. For the same reason, they likewise resisted the foreign, mostly Protestant missionaries who established schools throughout Greece.

Tolerance of other religions was over-supported by some in the English Party and others educated in the West as a symbol of Greece's progress as a liberal European state. In the end, power over the Church and education was ceded to the Russian Party, while the king maintained a veto over the decision of the Synod of Bishops. This was to keep balance and avoid discrediting Greece in the eyes of Western Europe as a backward, religiously intolerant society.

Catholic communities had been established in Greece since the 13th century (Athens, Cyclades, Chios, Crete). Jewish communities also existed in the country, those arriving after the Expulsion of the Jews from Spain (1492) joining the earlier Romaniotes, Jews who had been living there since the times of Apostle Paul. Muslim families were still living in Greece during Otto's reign, since hostility was mainly against the Ottoman state and its depressive mechanisms and not against Muslim people.

3 September 1843 Revolution

Although King Otto tried to function as an absolute monarch, as Thomas Gallant writes, he "was neither ruthless enough to be feared, nor compassionate enough to be loved, nor competent enough to be respected."

By 1843, public dissatisfaction with him had reached crisis proportions and there were demands for a Constitution. Initially Otto refused to grant a Constitution, but as soon as Bavarian troops were withdrawn from the kingdom, a popular revolt was launched.

On 3 September 1843, the infantry led by Colonel Dimitris Kallergis and the respected Revolutionary captain and former President of the Athens City Council General Yiannis Makriyiannis assembled in Palace Square in front of the Palace in Athens. Eventually joined by much of the population of the small capital, the crowd refused to disperse until the king agreed to grant a constitution, which would require that there be Greeks in the Council, that he convene a permanent National Assembly and that Otto personally thank the leaders of the uprising.

Left with little recourse now that his German troops were gone, King Otto gave in to the pressure and agreed to the demands of the crowd over the objections of his opinionated queen. This square was renamed Constitution Square to commemorate (through to the present) the events of September 1843—and to feature many later tumultuous events of Greek history. Now for the first time, the king had Greeks in his Council and the French Party, the English Party and the Russian Party (according to which of the Great Powers' culture they most esteemed) vied for rank and power.

The king's prestige, which was based in large part on his support by the combined Great Powers, but mostly the support of the British, suffered in the Pacifico incident of 1850, when British Foreign Secretary Palmerston sent the British fleet to blockade the port of Piraeus with warships to exact reparation for injustice done to a British subject.

Crimean War

The Great Idea (Μεγάλη Ιδέα), the irredentist concept that expresses the goal of reviving the Byzantine Empire, led him to contemplate entering the Crimean War on the side of Russia against Turkey and its British and French allies in 1853; the enterprise was unsuccessful and resulted in renewed intervention by the two Great Powers and a second blockade of the Piraeus port, forcing Greece to neutrality.

The continued inability of the royal couple to have children also raised the thorny issue of succession: the 1844 constitution insisted that Otto's successor had to be Orthodox, but as the king was childless, the only possible heirs were his younger brothers, Luitpold and Adalbert. The staunch Catholicism of the Wittelsbachs complicated matters, as Luitpold refused to convert and Adalbert married Infanta Amalia of Spain. The sons of Adalbert, and especially the eldest, Ludwig Ferdinand, were now considered the most likely candidates, but due to the issue of religion, no definite arrangements were ever made. 

In 1861, a student named Aristeidis Dosios (son of politician Konstantinos Dosios) attempted to murder Queen Amalia and was openly hailed as a hero. His attempt, however, also prompted spontaneous feelings of monarchism and sympathy towards the royal couple among the Greek population.

Exile and death 

While Otto was visiting the Peloponnese in 1862 a new coup was launched and this time a Provisional Government was set up and summoned a National Convention. Ambassadors of the Great Powers urged King Otto not to resist, and the king and queen took refuge on a British warship and returned to Bavaria aboard (the same way they had come to Greece), taking with them the Greek regalia which they had brought from Bavaria in 1832. In 1863 the Greek National Assembly elected Prince William of Denmark, aged only 17, King of the Hellenes under the regnal name of George I.

It has been suggested that had Otto and Amalia borne an heir, the king would not have been overthrown, as succession was also a major unresolved question at the time. However, the Constitution of 1844 made provision for his succession by his two younger brothers and their descendants.

Otto died in the palace of the former bishops of Bamberg, Germany, and was buried in the Theatiner Church in Munich. During his retirement, he would still wear the Greek traditional uniform, nowadays worn only by the evzones (Presidential Guards). Αccording to witnesses, Otto's last words were "Greece, my Greece, my beloved Greece."

Archives
Otto's letters to his sister, Princess Mathilde Caroline of Bavaria, Grand Duchess of Hesse, written between 1832 and 1861, are preserved in the Hessian State Archive (Hessisches Staatsarchiv Darmstadt) in Darmstadt, Germany.

Otto's letters to his father-in-law, Augustus, Grand Duke of Oldenburg, written between 1836 and 1853, are preserved in the Niedersächsisches Landesarchiv in Oldenburg, Germany.

Honours
He received the following honours:

Ancestry

See also
 Greek crown jewels

References

Bibliography
 Bower, Leonard, and Gordon Bolitho. Otho I, King of Greece: A Biography. London: Selwyn & Blount, 1939
 Dümler, Christian, and Kathrin Jung. Von Athen nach Bamberg: König Otto von Griechenland, Begleitheft zur Ausstellung in der Neuen Residenz Bamberg, 21. Juni bis 3. November 2002. München: Bayerische Schlösserverwaltung, 2002. .
 Hyland, M. Amalie, 1818–1875: Herzogin von Oldenburg, Königin von Griechenland. Oldenburg: Isensee, 2004. .
 
 Murken, Jan, and Saskia Durian-Ress. König-Otto-von-Griechenland-Museum der Gemeinde Ottobrunn. Bayerische Museen, Band 22. München: Weltkunst, 1995. .

External links
 

|-

1815 births
1867 deaths
19th-century Greek monarchs
19th-century prime ministers of Greece
Burials at the Theatine Church, Munich
Founding monarchs
House of Wittelsbach
Kings of Greece
Greek Roman Catholics
German Roman Catholics
Roman Catholic monarchs
Greek people of Bavarian descent
People from Salzburg
People from Upper Franconia
Princes of Bavaria
Prime Ministers of Greece
History of Greece (1832–1862)
Knights of the Golden Fleece of Austria
Grand Crosses of the Order of Saint Stephen of Hungary
Knights of the Golden Fleece of Spain